is a Japanese football player for Kamatamare Sanuki.

Club statistics
Updated to 23 February 2017.

References

External links
Profile at FC Tokyo

1996 births
Living people
People from Mitaka, Tokyo
Association football people from Tokyo Metropolis
Japanese footballers
J1 League players
J2 League players
J3 League players
FC Tokyo players
FC Tokyo U-23 players
Kamatamare Sanuki players
Association football midfielders